The Commission for the Conservation of Southern Bluefin Tuna (CCSBT) is a Regional fisheries management organisation and international organization with the purpose of managing the stocks of the critically endangered Southern bluefin tuna.
The secretariat is housed in Canberra, Australia. CCSBT was established by International treaty signed in Canberra on 10 May 1993 by Australia, Japan, and New Zealand, with the commission commencing a year later. Over the years additional nations have joined.

Member States 

Members are of three types: members (of the commission), (members of the) extended commission, and co-operation non-members:

References

External links
 Commission for the Conservation of Southern Bluefin Tuna

Fisheries agencies
Organizations established in 1994
International organisations based in Australia
Intergovernmental organizations established by treaty
Treaties entered into by the European Union
Treaties of Australia
Treaties of Japan
Treaties of New Zealand
Treaties of South Korea
Treaties of South Africa
Treaties of Indonesia
Treaties of Taiwan
1994 establishments in Australia